Torpedo Stadium is a multi-use stadium in Tolyatti, Russia.  It is currently used mostly for football matches and is the home ground of FC Lada Togliatti.  The stadium holds 18,000 people.

References 

Football venues in Russia
FC Lada-Tolyatti